Suhmata, was a Palestinian village, located  northeast of Acre. It was depopulated by the Golani Brigade during the 1948 Arab-Israeli war.

History
Separated from the neighboring village of Tarshiha by a deep gorge, the ruins of a Byzantine era church lay within Suhmata's village lands. Underground water reservoir and a burial cave that apparently dates to the Roman period have been found at the village site. Suhmata had a Christian population at least until the Persian invasion of Palestine (A.D. 614–627) and presumably many people remained Christian for some time after that.   What was earlier termed a Crusader-era castle constructed in the village was (rebuilt by Zahir al-Umar in the latter half of the 18th century),  turned out to be the Byzantine church. Excavations in 1932 revealed an inscription in the church's mosaic floor that dates to 555 CE. 

The Crusaders referred to the village as Samueth or Samahete. In 1179,  Baldwin IV confirmed the sale from  Viscountess Petronella of Acre  of houses, vineyards and gardens in  Samueth, the village of Suphie, and some houses in Castellum Regis to Count  Jocelyn III, uncle of  Baldwin IV,  for 4,500 bezants. However, Ronnie Ellenblum writes that it is unlikely that there was actual Frankish settlement in Suhmata at this time.

Ottoman era
In the late Ottoman era, in 1875,  Victor Guérin visited Suhmata, and noted that "the village [is] divided into two distinct quarters, occupies two hills near each other, between which is a great birket, partly cut in the rock and partly built. One of these hills is crowned by the remains of a fortress flanked by towers and built with simple rubble; it contained several subterranean magazines, a mosque, and various chambers. The foundation is attributed to Dhaher el Amer. It is now three parts demolished, and on the place where it stood grow vines and tobacco."

In 1881, the PEF's Survey of Western Palestine (SWP)  described  it as "a village, built of stone, containing about 400 Moslems,  situated on [a] ridge and [the] slope of [a] hill, surrounded by  figs,  olives and arable land; there are several cisterns and a spring near.

An elementary school for boys was founded in the village in 1886.  A population list from about 1887 showed  Sahmata to have  about 1,500 inhabitants; 1,400 Muslims and 100 Christians.

British Mandate era
During the Mandatory Palestine, an agricultural school was established. The schools, a mosque, a church, two rain-fed irrigation pools, existed up until 1948.

In the 1922 census of Palestine conducted by the British Mandate authorities, Submata  had a population of 632; 589 Muslims and 43 Melkite Christians,  increasing in the 1931 census to 796; 752 Muslims and 44 Christians,  in  a total of 175 houses.

Over 70 percent of the village land was rocky and uncultivated, covered with oak and wild pears. The agricultural land was planted with wheat, barley, maize, tobacco, and vegetables. Suhmata's tobacco had a reputation for quality. 

In the 1945 statistics,   Suhmata had a population of 1,130; 1060 Muslims and 70 Christians, with a total of 17,056 dunams of land. Of this, a total of 3,290 dunums was allocated to cereals; 1,901 dunums were irrigated or used for orchards,  while 135 dunams were built-up (urban) area.

Israeli period

During Operation Hiram, on 30 October 1948, the First Battalion of Israel's Golani Brigade assaulted the village, resulting in the exodus of its villagers. The village was left in ruins.

A naming committee established by the Jewish National Fund, which operated from 1948 to 1951 until its incorporation into a Governmental Naming Committee set up by Israel, renamed Suhmata "Hosen", meaning "Strength." Meron Benvenisti writes that the committee chose this symbolic new name after determining that there was no known Jewish historical connection to the village of Suhmata.

In 1992 the village site was described: "The site is covered with debris and broken walls from fallen stone houses, all of which are scattered among the olive trees that grow there. A castle and a wall that were probably built by the Crusaders still stand. The castle is on an elevated spot on the eastern side of the site, and the wall encloses the western quarter. The surrounding lands are partly forested and partly used as pasture."

Suhmata's former inhabitants founded a village committee in 1993 which organizes volunteer efforts. The village committee also conducted a survey of the displaced population from Suhmata and their distribution inside Israel. The village was also the focus of the 1996 play Sahmatah by Hanna Eady and Ed Mast.

See also
Depopulated Palestinian locations in Israel
List of villages depopulated during the Arab–Israeli conflict

References

Bibliography

External links
 Abnaa' Suhmata, "Sons of Suhmata", the website of the village committee established in 1993.
 Welcome to Suhmata at Palestineremembered
 Suhmata, Zochrot
Survey of Western Palestine, Map 3:  IAA, Wikimedia commons 
 Suhmata is here, 29/10/2005, Zochrot.
Hazneh Sama’an (Umm Afif), Suhmata, testimony, 2005, Zochrot.
 Suhmata at Khalil Sakakini Cultural Center
Suhmata photos, Dr. Moslih Kanaaneh
 http://www.yairgil.com/051029-zochrot/index.htm (29/10/2005)
 http://jacobk9.tripod.com/id37.html (29/10/2005)

District of Acre
Arab villages depopulated during the 1948 Arab–Israeli War
1948 disestablishments in Israel